The Kharkiv government building airstrike occurred on March 1, 2022, when Russian forces attacked the government administrative building of the Kharkiv oblast in the Kharkiv.

Air attack 
The attack on the Kharkiv government building took place in the context of the battle of Kharkiv against Russian hosts coming from the northwest.

Russian troops launched two rockets against the administration building, resulting in the death of 29 people, the destruction of the building itself and serious damage to other structures in the Freedom Square area. In June of 2022, the government building was recognized as not subject to restoration.

Details 
It was recorded that the attack weapon were two missiles Kalibr, the attack left an estimated 35 wounded and 29 dead. The Ukrainian government expressed that the attack developed at 8:00 am. of the morning on the Eastern European daylight saving time.

See also 
 Mykolaiv government building airstrike
 February 2022 Kharkiv cluster bombing
 March 2022 Kharkiv cluster bombing
 April 2022 Kharkiv cluster bombing

References

External links 
 

March 2022 events in Ukraine
2020s building bombings
21st-century mass murder in Ukraine
Airstrikes during the 2022 Russian invasion of Ukraine
Attacks on buildings and structures in 2022
Attacks on buildings and structures in Ukraine
Building bombings in Europe
Mass murder in 2022
Russian war crimes in Ukraine
War crimes during the 2022 Russian invasion of Ukraine
March 2022 crimes in Europe
History of Kharkiv Oblast
Airstrikes conducted by Russia